James Burrows (born 7 July 1991) is an English actor. He is best known for his roles as of Ali Neeson in  Coronation Street and Emmerdale as Kenny McDonald and his recurring roles in Safe House (2015) and Mount Pleasant (2016).

Personal life
Burrows is in a relationship with Sophie Coates. Their daughter, Betty Florence, was born on 25 April 2019. The couple got engaged that August.

Filmography

Film

Television

References

External links

1991 births
Living people
English male soap opera actors
English male film actors
21st-century English male actors
People from Derby
Male actors from Derbyshire